Potlapahad is a village in Penpahad mandal of Suryapet district in Telangana, India. It is located 22 km from district headquarters, Suryapet.

Geography
It is in the 152 m elevation(altitude) .

Demographics
Potlapahad has population of 1812 of which 900 are males while 912 are females as per Population Census 2011. The literacy rate of village was 64.87% where Male literacy stands at 74.37% while female literacy rate was 55.70%.

Politics
It falls under Suryapet Assembly constituency and the village is administrated by Sarpanch.

References

Villages in Suryapet district